Paris Township, Ohio may refer to:
Paris Township, Portage County, Ohio
Paris Township, Stark County, Ohio
Paris Township, Union County, Ohio

See also
Paris Township (disambiguation)

Ohio township disambiguation pages